The following is a list of notable Pakistani Americans,  including both original immigrants who obtained American citizenship and their American descendants.

To be included in this list, the person must have a Wikipedia article showing they are Pakistani American or must have references showing they are Pakistani American and are notable.

Academia, science and technology
 
Abdul J. Tajik – researcher in clinical medicine
 Adil Haider – trauma surgeon and former Kessler Director for the Center for Surgery and Public Health, a joint initiative of the Brigham and Women's Hospital and Harvard Medical School 
Adil Najam – professor of earth, environment and international relations and dean of the Frederick S. Pardee School of Global Studies at Boston University; founding editor of blog Pakistaniat
Ahsan Kareem – Robert M Moran Professor of Engineering at the University of Notre Dame; director of the NatHaz Modeling Laboratory; member of the US, Chinese, Japanese and Indian Academies of Engineering
Akbar S. Ahmed – U.S. resident Pakistani anthropologist; the Ibn Khaldun Chair of Islamic Studies at American University; producer of the film Journey Into Europe, on Islam in Europe
 Ali S. Khan – surgeon and former director of the Office of Public Health Preparedness and Response (PHPR) at the Centers for Disease Control and Prevention
Anwar Shaikh – professor of economics at the graduate faculty of The New School in New York City
Asad Abidi – professor of electrical engineering at the University of California, Los Angeles; member of the National Academy of Engineering
 Ashar Aziz – electrical engineer, business executive and founder of FireEye
 Azra Raza – Chan Soon-Shiong Professor of Medicine and director of Myelodysplastic Syndrome (MDS) Center at Columbia University.
 Atif Mian – professor of economics at Princeton University 
Ayesha Jalal – MacArthur Fellow and Richardson Professor of History at Tufts University
Ayub K. Ommaya – neurosurgeon and expert in traumatic brain injuries, clinical researcher at the National Institutes of Health; invented the Ommaya reservoir, which is used to provide chemotherapy directly to brain tumors 
Azra Raza – Chan Soon-Shiong Professor of Medicine and director of Myelodysplastic Syndrome (MDS) Center at Columbia University. 
Farooq Azam – distinguished professor at Scripps Institution of Oceanography, University of California, San Diego; researcher in the field of marine microbiology
Gul Agha – professor of computer science at the University of Illinois at Urbana-Champaign 
Hafeez Malik – professor of political science at Villanova University, in Pennsylvania
Hamid Nawab – professor of electrical and computer engineering and biomedical engineering, Boston University; co-author of widely used textbook Signals and Systems (1997), published by Prentice Hall (Pearson); researcher in signal processing and machine perception with application to auditory, speech, and neuromuscular systems 
Irfan Siddiqi – professor of physics at the University of California, Berkeley, and also vice chair of the university's department of physics 
Mark S. Humayun – professor of ophthalmology at Keck School of Medicine, University of Southern California, holder of the Cornelius J. Pings Chair in Biomedical Sciences, and director of USC Eye Institute and Institute For Biomedical Therapeutics 
Muhammed S. Zubairy – professor in the department of physics and astronomy and holder of the Munnerlyn-Heep Chair in Quantum Optics at the Texas A&M University
Mujaddid A. Ijaz – physicist known for his work at Oak Ridge National Laboratory, professor of physics at Virginia Tech
Nergis Mavalvala – Kathleen Marble Professor of Astrophysics at the Massachusetts Institute of Technology (MIT),  and 2010 MacArthur Fellow; part of the team that made the first direct gravitational wave observation. Dean of MIT's School of Science.
Saleem H. Ali – environmental researcher and associate dean for graduate studies at the University of Vermont's Rubenstein School of Environment and Natural Resources; writer and contributor to publications such as the International Herald Tribune
Rayid Ghani – senior fellow and director of the Center for Data Science and Public Policy at the Computation Institute (a joint initiative of the University of Chicago and the Argonne National Laboratory), as well as the research director of the institute. Also a senior fellow at the Harris School of Public Policy of the University of Chicago.
Sara Suleri – professor of English at Yale University
Shahab Ahmed – Scholar of Islam at Harvard University
Syra Madad – pathogen preparedness expert and infectious disease epidemiologist
Talal Asad – professor of anthropology and religious studies at CUNY
Wasiullah Khan – founder and chancellor of East-West University
Zaheer Ahmad – doctor in internal medicine; founder of the Shifa International Hospital
Zia Mian – physicist and co-director of the Program on Science and Global Security at Princeton University

Business and finance

Farooq Kathwari – chairman, president and chief executive officer of Ethan Allen
 Fred Hassan – chairman of the board and chief executive officer of pharmaceutical company Schering-Plough from 2003 to 2009, when the company completed its merger with Merck & Co
 Ghulam Bombaywala – owner and operator of multiple restaurants
Javed Ahmed – currently lives in London, where his headquarters are; former chief executive officer of Tate & Lyle, a FTSE 250 company which is one of Britain's oldest brands
Mansoor Ijaz – businessman; founder and chairman of Crescent Investment Management LLC, a New York investment partnership; commentator on Fox News
Michael Chowdry – businessman; founder of air cargo company Atlas Air, which in 2001 was worth over $1.39 billion
Nabeel Gareeb –  appointed president and chief executive officer and a member of the board of directors of MEMC in 2002; according to CNN he was the 24th highest paid CEO in 2006; according to Forbes he was the 6th highest earning CEO in 2008 in the US
Qasim Khan - International automotive business management executive who has served with General Motors Company since 1999 at various International operations in Middle East, Russia/ CIS, South Korea  and Middle East operations while his US assignments were based at company's offices in New York (Cadillac Global HQ), Miami (Latin American HQ) and Michigan. 
Ramesh Balwani –  businessman; former president and COO of Theranos 
 Safi Qureshey – former CEO and co-founder of AST Research, a Fortune 500 company with revenues over US$2.5 billion
 Shahid Khan – president of Flex-N-Gate Corp., with $2 billion in annual revenue; in mid-December 2011 bought a majority stake of NFL team Jacksonville Jaguars for $760 million
Sohaib Abbasi – former chairman and CEO of Informatica
Tariq Farid – entrepreneur; owner and CEO of Edible Arrangements
Zia Chishti – founder, CEO and chairman of the board of directors of Afiniti.
Osman Rashid – co-founder of Chegg

Media, art and entertainment

There are Urdu radio stations in areas with high Pakistani populations. Several cable and satellite providers offer Pakistani channels, including GEO TV, ARY Digital, and PTV. Others have offered Pakistani content for subscription, such as when Pakistan played Australia for the Cricket World Cup in 1999. In July 2005, MTV premiered a spin-off network called MTV Desi which targets South Asian Americans in the US, including Pakistanis. MTV Desi closed operations as part of the shutdown of MTV World in April 2007.

Adam Amin – sports announcer for ESPN
Bassam Tariq – film director
Fahad Azam – rapper going by the stage name of Mr. Capone-E

Fahad Rehmani – Actor, television director and drama producer

Fareed Haque – guitarist of Pakistani and Chilean descent
Aishah Hasnie – television reporter and news anchor for Fox News
Christel Khalil – of mixed Pakistani and African American descent
Aamina Sheikh – actress and model
Faran Tahir – actor; born in the U.S. but was raised in Pakistan
Dilshad Vadsaria – Pakistani American of Indian and Portuguese descent; television actress, Greek
Gregory J. Qaiyum – stage name GQ, American actor of German, English and Pakistani descent
Iqbal Theba – starred in numerous American sitcoms but most famous for playing Principal Figgins on the show Glee
Jahan Yousaf – part of EDM duo Krewella
Jeffery A. Qaiyum – stage name JAQ; American professional b-boy of German, English and Pakistani descent
Kamran Rashid Khan – stage name Lazarus, physician and rapper from Detroit

Kamran Pasha – Hollywood screenwriter and director; wrote the Showtime hit series Sleeper Cell
Kumail Nanjiani – actor and comedian, Franklin & Bash, Silicon Valley.
Lubna Agha – artist
Maheen Rizvi – Pakistani-American TV model and actress
Mehr Hassan – Indian father, Pakistani mother; actress, model and classical dancer
Mehreen Jabbar – film director
Minhal Baig – film director
Munaf Rayani – guitarist for the Texan post-rock band Explosions in the Sky
Munni Begum – born Nadira; ghazal singer from Pakistan; based in Chicago, Illinois
 Muqeem Khan – first Pakistani in the Hollywood VFX industry, 1996
Nadia Ali – songwriter and former frontwoman of iiO
 Nadia Ali – erotic dancer and former actress in pornographic films 
Nargis Fakhri – actress and model of half Pakistani and half Czech descent
Naureen Zaim – half Pakistani, half Irish; model, actress and athlete
Roger David – stage name Bohemia, rapper from San Francisco
Romil Hemnani – record producer, recording engineer, and DJ best known for being one of the main producers for American hip hop band BROCKHAMPTON
Sadia Shepard – filmmaker and author
Saeeda Imtiaz – Pakistani-American actress
Salman Ahmad – founder and member of Junoon; lives in New York; a UN Goodwill Ambassador
Sameer A. Gardezi – Pakistani-American screenwriter for film and television best known for his work on Modern Family
Samia Khan – Pakistani-American writer and news personality
 Shahzia Sikander – painter
 Shams Charania – prominent NBA reporter for The Athletic
 Sitara Hewitt – Canadian-American actress
Somy Ali – former Bollywood actress, now model and journalist
Sophia Ali - Pakistani-American actress 
 Sumail Hassan – professional Dota 2 player, part of the team Evil Geniuses
Syma Chowdhry – television personality
Yasmine Yousaf – part of EDM duo Krewella
Zehra Fazal – actress and comedian

Military
Colonel Fazal Hussain of the United States Air Force – received Defense Meritorious Service Medal and Joint Service Commendation Medal for his distinguished accomplishments and outstanding contributions as a senior leader.
Captain Humayun Khan of the United States Army – received Purple Heart and Bronze Star for heroic actions during Operation Iraqi Freedom
Specialist Kareem R.S Khan of the U.S. Army – recipient of the Purple Heart and Bronze Star for heroic actions during Operation Iraqi Freedom

Pageant winners
Mariyah Moten – born in Karachi, Pakistan; now living in Houston Texas; Pakistan's first Miss Pakistan Bikini; third runner-up in the Miss Pakistan World pageant
Ramina Ashfaque – Miss Pakistan World 2016–2017; from Miami, Florida

Politics, government and law

Abid Riaz Qureshi – attorney and legal partner at Latham & Watkins, member of Legal Ethics Committee of District of Columbia Bar and former nominee for federal judge of United States District Court for the District of Columbia
Ameena Mohyuddin Zia, PhD - former Political Appointee of St. Louis County Government and founder of Blue Ridge Impact Consulting
Arif Alikhan – former appointee to the Obama Administration, where he served as assistant secretary for policy development at the United States Department of Homeland Security; former deputy mayor of homeland security and public safety for the City of Los Angeles; visiting professor of homeland security and counterterrorism at the National Defense University's (NDU) College of International Security Affairs in Washington, D.C.
Atif Qarni – Virginia Secretary of Education in the Cabinet of Governor Ralph Northam
Ali Zaidi – lawyer and policy advisor, Deputy White House National Climate Advisor 
Dilawar Syed – Nominated for Deputy Administrator of the Small Business Administration.
Ehsan Zaffar – senior U.S. government advisor on civil rights
Faiz Shakir – political advisor, campaign manager for the Bernie Sanders 2020 presidential campaign
Gholam Mujtaba – chair of the Pakistan Policy Institute, a think tank dedicated to improve the US-Pakistan relationship
Lina Khan – legal scholar specializing in US antitrust and competition law, associate professor of law at Columbia Law School, and chair of the Federal Trade Commission
Mahbub ul Haq – game theorist, economist and an international development theorist. Creator of Human Development Report.
Sada Cumber – first U.S. envoy to the Organisation of the Islamic Conference
Sadaf Jaffer – first female Muslim American mayor, first female South Asian mayor, and first female Pakistani-American mayor in the United States, of Montgomery in Somerset County, New Jersey.
 Saghir Tahir – New Hampshire State Representative; the only elected Pakistani American in the Republican Party; re-elected in 2006 for a fourth term to represent Ward 2, District 9 in his home town of Manchester
Saqib Ali – served as delegate to the Maryland House of Delegates, elected in 2006, represented the 39th District
Shamila N. Chaudhary – US government policy adviser
Shirin R. Tahir-Kheli – White House appointee at various senior posts in the executive branch and the State department during five Republican administrations
 Zahid Quraishi –  United States Magistrate Judge of the United States District Court for the District of New Jersey.
 Zainab Ahmad – prosecutor of the United States Department of Justice, former Assistant United States Attorney for Eastern District of New York. Was a member of the investigation team of the Special Counsel Robert Mueller that investigated possible Russian interference in the 2016 United States elections.

Sports
Asif Mujtaba - Pakistani Cricketer 
 Ali Khan – American Cricketer
Farhan Zaidi – President of Baseball Operations, San Francisco Giants.
Gibran Hamdan – professional footballer in the NFL. He is the first person of Pakistani descent to play in the NFL.
Hasan Habib – professional poker player
Mustafa Ali – professional wrestler, currently signed to WWE, first wrestler in WWE of Pakistani Descent.
Nasir Javed – professional cricketer
Nur B. Ali – racecar driver who drives in the ARCA Series for Cunningham Motorsports; the first Pakistani to become a racing driver; former two-time Southwest Formula Mazda Series Champion (2001 and 2002)
Rashid Zia – professional cricketer; represented the United States in the ICC trophy in 2001

Writers

Asma G. Hasan – award-winning writer; works includes the book Red, White, and Muslim, a biographical view of growing up as an American Muslim
Bapsi Sidhwa – Pakistani novelist and playwright of Parsi-Zoroastrian background who now resides in Texas; her novel Cracking India (which described the Partition of British colonial India) was the basis for Deepa Mehta's film Earth
Daniyal Mueenuddin – author of the short-story collection In Other Rooms, Other Wonders
Imad Rahman – fiction writer whose first short story collection was published in 2004
Maliha Masood – award-winning writer in creative non-fiction; author of the travel memoir Zaatar Days, Henna Nights
Nabeel Qureshi – Christian apologetic, author, and speaker.
Noon M. Danish – Pakistani poet of African and Baloch descent 
Nouman Ali Khan – Muslim speaker and author.
Raees Warsi – award-winning poet; writer and founder of Urdu Markaz New York (Urdu Language Center) in 1989
Rohina Malik – playwright, actress and solo performance artist 
Samina Quraeshi – award-winning author, artist and designer
Sana Amanat – American comic book editor for Marvel Comics; co-created the first solo series to feature a Muslim female super hero, Ms. Marvel, which gained worldwide media attention, sparking excitement and dialogue about identity and the Muslim-American struggle
 Shaila Abdullah – Pakistani women's writer and author
 Yasir Qadhi –  Muslim author and Islamic teacher
Zulfikar Ghose – novelist, poet and essayist

Other
 Aasiya Zubair – network executive
Abdul M. Mujahid – American Muslim religious leader, activist, film producer, non-profit entrepreneur
Ahmad Adaya – American Muslim real estate tycoon and philanthropist; founding partner of prominent California real estate company, IDS Real Estate Group
Arsalan Iftikhar – American international human rights lawyer headquartered in the metropolitan Washington, D.C., area; founder of TheMuslimGuy; Contributing Editor for Islamica magazine
Faisal Alam – gay Pakistani-American who founded the Al-Fatiha Foundation, an organization dedicated to advancing the cause of gay, lesbian and transgender Muslims
Fatima Ali – chef and restaurateur.
Mohammad S. Hamdani  – Muslim Pakistani American medical student who was killed in the September 11, 2001 attacks while rescuing victims at the World Trade Center
Riffat Hassan – theologian and Islamic feminist scholar of the Qur'an
Sky Metalwala – child missing from the Seattle area. since 2011
Yasmin A. Khan – American-Pakistani philanthropist

See also
Pakistani Americans
Pakistan – United States relations
List of Americans in Pakistan
Pakistani Canadians
List of Pakistani Canadians
British Pakistanis
List of British Pakistanis
Pakistani Australians
List of Pakistani Australians

References

Pakistani

America
Americans
Pakistani
Pakistani